Nessia didactyla, also known as the two-toed nessia and two-toed snakeskink, is a species of skink endemic to island of Sri Lanka.

Habitat & Distribution
A low hill to submountain skink species, known from localities that lie at 500–1000m of elevation, including Polgahawela, Billegama, and Dewatura.

Description
Midbody scales rows 24–28. Snout broad and blunt. Fronto-nasal larger than rostral, but slightly smaller than frontal. Lower eyelid scaly. Each limb with two digits, hence the name. Pre-anals slightly enlarged.
Dorsum brown, each scale with a darker border. Ventrally light brown.

References

Nessia
Reptiles of Sri Lanka
Endemic fauna of Sri Lanka
Reptiles described in 1934
Taxa named by Paulus Edward Pieris Deraniyagala